Dar Kola may refer to:
 Dar Kola, Amol
 Dar Kola, Nur